Gold halides are compounds of gold with the halogens.

Monohalides 
AuCl, AuBr, and AuI are all crystalline solids with a structure containing alternating linear chains: ..-X-Au-X-Au-X-Au-X-... The X-Au-X angle is less than 180°.

The monomeric AuF molecule has been detected in the gas phase.

Trihalides 
Gold triiodide does not exist or is unstable.

Gold(III) fluoride, AuF3, has a unique polymeric helical structure, containing corner-sharing {AuF4} squares.

Pentahalides 
Gold(V) fluoride, AuF5, is the only known example of gold in the +5 oxidation state. It most commonly occurs as the dimer Au2F10.

References 

Metal halides
Gold–halogen compounds